Bux is either of two surnames with separate origins. In Europe, it is an Old English surname derived from the Anglo-Saxon word buc meaning 'beach'. It is also an alternative spelling of Buksh, a Muslim surname or male given name, derived from the Persian word bakhsh, meaning "fate", "destiny" or "share".

Notable people with the surname include:

Danielle Lineker (née Bux; born 1979), Welsh actress and model
Graham Bux (born 1957), Australian footballer
Karim Bux (1865–?), Indian wrestler
Karlheinz Bux (born 1952), German sculptor, relief muralist, and mixed-media artist
Ishaq Bux (1917–2000), Indian and British actor
Kuda Bux (1905–1981), Pakistan-born American mystic, magician and firewalker
Lal Bakhsh ( Lal Bux; born 1943), Pakistani cyclist and Olympics competitor
Luciano Bux (1936–2014), Italian Roman Catholic bishop
Madar Bux (1907–1967), Bengali politician
Miran Bux (1907–1991), Pakistani cricketer
Pir Ilahi Bux (1890–1975), Pakistani politician and activist

Fictional characters
Bastian Balthazar Bux, from The Neverending Story

Iranian masculine given names
Urdu-language surnames
Pakistani names